Turner, Arkansas may be one of two unincorporated places in Arkansas.

 Turner, Mississippi County, Arkansas
 Turner, Phillips County, Arkansas